Igor Yuryevich Makarov (born 10 June 1970) is a Russian professional football coach and a former player.

Club career
He made his professional debut in the Soviet Second League in 1988 for FC Torpedo Vladimir.

Honours
 Soviet Cup finalist: 1992.

References

1970 births
People from Vladimir Oblast
Living people
Soviet footballers
Russian footballers
Association football midfielders
PFC CSKA Moscow players
Russian Premier League players
FC Fakel Voronezh players
FC Baltika Kaliningrad players
FC Ural Yekaterinburg players
FC Metallurg Lipetsk players
Russian football managers
FC Yenisey Krasnoyarsk players
FC Torpedo Vladimir players
FC Spartak Nizhny Novgorod players
Sportspeople from Vladimir Oblast